Röda dagar is a 2013 Erik Linder Christmas album.

Track listing
Jul, jul, strålande jul (Gustaf Nordqvist, Edvard Evers)
Röda dagar (Erik Linder, Johan Randén, Nicklas Eklund)
Gläns över sjö och strand (Ivar Widén, Viktor Rydberg)
Jul i stan (Johan Larsson, Erik Linder)
Stilla natt (Stille Nacht, heilige Nacht) (Franz Gruber, Torsten Fogelqvist)
Jag känner lugnet i kväll (Erik Linder)
Julen är här igen (Erik Linder, Fredrik Wide)
Min gamla stad (Jörgen Toresson)
När det lider mot jul (Det strålar en stjärna) (Ruben Liljefors, Jeanna Oterdahl)
När julen knackar på (Erik Linder, Nicklas Eklund)
Julsång (Cantique de Noël) (Adolphe Adam, Augustin Kock)
Vinternatt (Erik Linder, Johan Randén)
Ave Maria (Franz Schubert, Ture Rangström)

Contributors
Erik Linder - vocals
Fredrik Wide - piano, keyboards
Bengan Andersson - drums
Sven Lindvall - double bass
Sebastian Freij - violoncello
Martin Lindqvist - saxophone
Johan Randén - guitar, bass, producer

Charts

References 

2013 Christmas albums
Christmas albums by Swedish artists
Pop Christmas albums
Erik Linder albums
Swedish-language albums